Paramuricea is a genus of gorgonian-type octocorals in the family Plexauridae.

Species
The World Register of Marine Species lists these species:

Paramuricea aequatorialis Wright & Studer, 1889
Paramuricea biscaya Grasshoff, 1977
Paramuricea candida Grasshoff, 1977
Paramuricea clavata (Risso, 1826)
Paramuricea echinata Deichmann, 1936
Paramuricea grandis Verrill, 1883
Paramuricea grayi (Johnson, 1861)
Paramuricea hawaiensis Nutting, 1908
Paramuricea hirsuta (Gray, 1851)
Paramuricea hyalina Kükenthal, 1919
Paramuricea indica Thomson & Henderson, 1906

Paramuricea intermedia Kölliker, 1865
Paramuricea johnsoni (Studer, 1878)
Paramuricea laxa Wright & Studer, 1889
Paramuricea macrospina (Koch, 1882)
Paramuricea multispina Deichmann, 1936
Paramuricea placomus (Linnaeus, 1758)
Paramuricea ramosa Wright & Studer, 1889
Paramuricea robusta Thomson & Ritchie, 1906
Paramuricea spinosa Kölliker, 1865
Paramuricea tenuis Verrill, 1883

References

Plexauridae
Octocorallia genera